The Philippine Institute of Volcanology and Seismology (PHIVOLCS,) is a Philippine national institution dedicated to provide information on the activities of volcanoes, earthquakes, and tsunamis, as well as other specialized information and services primarily for the protection of life and property and in support of economic, productivity, and sustainable development. It is one of the service agencies of the Department of Science and Technology.

PHIVOLCS monitors volcano, earthquake, and tsunami activity, and issues warnings as necessary. It is mandated to mitigate disasters that may arise from such volcanic eruptions, earthquakes, tsunamis, and other related geotectonic phenomena.

History
This government organization was formed after a historical merging of official functions of government institutions.

One of its first predecessors is the Philippine Weather Bureau created in 1901 when meteorological, seismological and terrestrial magnetic services of the Manila Observatory were transferred from the Roman Catholic Church to the American Colonial Government. It performed earthquake monitoring in the country and has inherited and maintained the early earthquake catalogue at that time. By 1972, the Philippine Weather Bureau was reorganized under Presidential Decree No. 78 into the Philippine Atmospheric Geophysical and Astronomical Services Administration (PAGASA). A United Nations Development Programme-funded project for PAGASA established a twelve-station earthquake monitoring network in the country. 

In February 1951, Dr. Jose M. Feliciano, Chair of the Division of Physical and Mathematical Sciences of the National Research Council of the Philippines (NRCP) presented a proposal for the creation of a Commission on Volcanology.  The eruption of  Hibok-Hibok in December 1951 and the consequent destruction and loss of lives led to the closer cooperation by the Geology, Seismology, and Volcanology Section, committee on Volcanology of the Department of Agriculture and Natural Resources, to study volcanoes in the Philippines.  This collaboration let to the enactment of Republic Act No. 766 on June 20, 1952 that created the Commission of Volcanology (COMVOL).  This Commission was placed under NRCP and its office was initially set up in the College of Liberal Arts in UP Diliman.  Under Executive Order No. 784 of March 17, 1982, the umbrella department of COMVOL, the National Science Development Board (NSDB) was reorganized into the National Science and Technology Authority (NSTA), and COMVOL was restructured to become the Philippine Institute of Volcanology or PHIVOLC.

The seismological arm of PAGASA was officially transferred to PHIVOLC on September 17, 1984 through Executive Order No. 984, renaming the institute as the Philippines Institute of Volcanology and Seismology or PHIVOLCS. The NSTA, the umbrella department for PHIVOLCS and PAGASA, became the Department of Science and Technology (DOST) in 1987. The technical staff and the 12-station earthquake monitoring network was fully integrated to PHIVOLCS in 1988.

PHILVOCS and the United States Geological Survey collaborated during the 1991 eruption of Mount Pinatubo. Their forecast provided the timely evacuation of military personnel and residents that were affected by the eruption.

PHIVOLCS was headed by Raymundo Punongbayan from 1982 to 2002, and it is currently headed by Renato U. Solidum Jr. from 2003 to the present.

Classification of volcanoes in the Philippines

PHIVOLCS classifies volcanoes as active, potentially active, or inactive:

Active

Eruption in historic times
Historical record within 600 years
Radiocarbon dating (C14) dating to 10,000 years
Local seismic activity
Oral or folkloric history

Potentially active

Active solfataras, fumaroles, or steaming activity
Geologically young, possibly erupted < 10,000 years and for calderas and large systems, possibly < 25,000 years.
Young-looking geomorphology (thin soil cover or sparse vegetation; low degree of erosion and dissection; young vent features; with or without vegetation cover).
Suspected seismic activity.
Documented local ground deformation.
Geochemical indicators of magmatic involvement.
Geophysical proof of magma bodies.
Strong connection with subduction zones and external tectonic settings.

Inactive

No record of eruption and its form is beginning to change by the agents of weathering and erosion via formation of deep and long gullies.

See also
PHIVOLCS Earthquake Intensity Scale
Geography of the Philippines
List of volcanoes in the Philippines
Manila Observatory

References

External links

Department of Science and Technology (Philippines)
Geology organizations
Volcano observatories
Seismological observatories, organisations and projects
Volcanism of the Philippines
Government agencies established in 1982
1982 establishments in the Philippines
Establishments by Philippine executive order